The 2010–11 season was Arbroath's first season back in the Scottish Third Division, having been relegated from the Scottish Second Division at the end of the 2009–10 season. Arbroath also competed in the Challenge Cup, League Cup and the Scottish Cup.

Summary
Arbroath finished first in the Third Division and were promoted to the Second Division. They reached the first round of the Challenge Cup, the first round of the League Cup, and the second round of the Scottish Cup.

Management
The club were managed during season 2010–11 by Paul Sheerin. Sheerin was appointed during pre season following the resignation of Jim Weir, who resigned following the club's relegation in order to join Brechin City.

Results and fixtures

Scottish Third Division

Scottish Challenge Cup

Scottish League Cup

Scottish Cup

Player statistics

Squad 

|}

League table

References

Arbroath
2010andndash;11